Hatip Mehmed Efendi (died 1773) was an Ottoman paper marbling artist noted for improving the consistency of the size enabling stronger colours and patterns.

He served as the khatib (the individual who delivers the khutbah) of Hagia Sophia, therefore was known as khatib or khatib of Hagia Sophia.

He died during a fire at his house in Sirkeci while attempting to save his works.

References 

1773 deaths
Artists from the Ottoman Empire